Fluidity may refer to:

In science

Reciprocal of viscosity
Cognitive fluidity
Fluid intelligence
Membrane fluidity
Sexual fluidity

Other

Fluidity (video game)